Mucilaginibacter antarcticus  is a Gram-negative, rod-shaped, anaerobic and non-motile bacterium from the genus of Mucilaginibacter which has been isolated from soil near Antarctic Peninsula.

References

External links
Type strain of Mucilaginibacter antarcticus at BacDive -  the Bacterial Diversity Metadatabase

Sphingobacteriia